Yap Tjwan Bing (1910-1988) was an Indonesian politician active in the Indonesian independence movement.

Life and career
Bing was born in Kediri, son of a Chinese Indonesian merchant. He trained in pharmacy in Amsterdam (1932-1939) and subsequently returned to Indonesia to work in Bandung. He was a member of the Central Advisory Council during the Japanese occupation of the Dutch East Indies. In 1945, he was the sole Chinese member of the Preparatory Committee for Indonesian Independence (PPKI). After the declaration of Indonesian independence in 1945, he moved to Yogyakarta, where he founded the Chung Hwa Chung Hwee-Central in support of Indonesian independence. In 1948, he merged this organization into the Persatuan Tionghoa.  He became a member of the Partai Nasional Indonesia (PNI) and sat in the Indonesian parliament until 1955. He was one of the first members of the Ikatan Apotheker Indonesia (founded in 1955). In May 1963, his house and car were burnt by a mob in an anti-Chinese riot in Bandung.  He moved to the United States soon afterwards and did not return to Indonesia.  Jalan Jagalan in Surakarta was renamed Jalan Yap Tjwan Bing on 22 Februari 2008. He was a Protestant Christian.

He died in 1988.

References

1910 births
1988 deaths
20th-century Indonesian politicians
Indonesian collaborators with Imperial Japan
Indonesian National Awakening
Indonesian people of Chinese descent
Members of the Central Advisory Council
People from Surakarta